Leuciscinae is a subfamily of the freshwater fish family Cyprinidae, which contains the true minnows.

Members of the Old World (OW) clade of minnows within this subfamily are known as European minnows. As the name suggests, most members of the OW clade are found in Eurasia, aside from the golden shiner (Notemigonus crysoleucas), which is found in eastern North America.

According to ancestral area reconstruction, the subfamily Leuiciscinae is thought to have originated in Europe before becoming widely distributed in parts of Europe, Asia and North America. Evidence for the dispersal of this subfamily can be marked by biogeographical scenarios/observations, geomorphological changes, phylogenetic relationships as well as evidence for vicariance events taking place through time. Through analyses and evidence of divergence time, it was observed that the two monophyletic groups, the phoxinins and the leuciscins, had shared a common ancestor dating to approximately 70.7 million years ago, representing their lengthy evolutionary history.
The 5th edition of the Fishes of the World classifies the Leuciscinae as a subfamily of the Cyprinidae but other classifications have resolved this taxon as a family, the Leuciscidae.

Genera
According to a 2018 study, Leuciscinae may be subdivided into 6 clades, or, if Leuciscidae is treated as a valid family, subfamilies:

 North American clade (Subfamily Pogonichthyinae sensu Schönhuth et al.):
 Agosia Agosia Girard, 1856 (longfin dace)
 Algansea Girard, 1856 (Mexican chubs) 
 Aztecula Jordan & Evermann, 1898 (Aztec chub)
 Campostoma Agassiz, 1855 (stonerollers)
 Clinostomus Girard, 1856 (redside daces)
 Codoma Girard, 1856 (ornate shiner)
 Cyprinella Girard, 1856 (satinfin shiners)
 Dionda Girard, 1856 (desert minnows)
 Ericymba Cope, 1865 (longjaw minnows)
 Erimystax Jordan, 1882(slender chubs)
 Exoglossum Rafinesque, 1818 (cutlips minnows)
 Hybognathus Agassiz, 1855 (silvery minnows)
 Hybopsis Agassiz, 1854 (bigeye chubs)
 Iotichthys Jordan & Evermann, 1896 (least chub)
 Luxilus Rafinesque, 1820 (highscale shiners)
 Lythrurus Jordan, 1876 (finescale shiners)
 Macrhybopsis Cockerell & Allison 1909 (blacktail chubs)
 Mylocheilus Agassiz, 1855 (peamouth)
 Nocomis Girard, 1856 (hornyhead chubs)
 Notropis Rafinesque, 1818 (eastern shiners)
 Opsopoeodus Hay, 1881 (pugnose minnow)
 Oregonichthys Hubbs, 1929 (Oregon chubs)
 Phenacobius Cope, 1867 (suckermouth minnows)
 Pimephales Rafinesque, 1820 (bluntnose minnows)
 Platygobio gill, 1863 (flathead chub)
 Pogonichthys Girard, 1854 (splittails)
 Pteronotropis Fowler, 1935 (flagfin shiners)
 Rhinichthys Agassiz, 1849 (riffle daces, loach minnows) (including Tiaroga)
 Richardsonius Girard, 1856 (redside shiners)
Stypodon Garman, 1881
 Tampichthys Schönhuth, Doadrio, Dominguez-Dominguez, Hillis & Mayden, 2008
 Yuriria Jordan & Evermann, 1896
 Phoxinus (PHX) clade (subfamily Phoxininae sensu Schönhuth et al.): 
 Phoxinus Rafinesque, 1820 (Eurasian minnows and daces)
 Old World (OW) clade (subfamily Leuciscinae sensu Schönhuth et al.):
 Abramis Cuvier, 1816 (common bream)
 Acanthobrama Heckel, 1843 (bleaks)
 Achondrostoma Robalo, Almada, Levy & Doadrio, 2007
 Alburnoides Jeitteles, 1861 (riffle minnows)
 Alburnus Rafinesque, 1820 (bleaks)
 Anaecypris  Collares-Pereira, 1983 (Spanish minnowcarp)
 Aspiolucius Berg, 1907 (pike-asp)
 Ballerus Heckel, 1843 (breams)
 Blicca Heckel, 1843 (Silver bream)
 Capoetobrama Berg, 1916 (sharpray)
 Chondrostoma Agassiz, 1832 (typical nases)
 Delminichthys Freyhof, Lieckfeldt, Bogutskaya, Pitra & Ludwig, 2006
 Egirdira Freyhof, 2022
 Iberochondrostoma Robalo, Almada, Levy & Doadrio, 2007
 Iberocypris Doadrio, 1980
 Ladigesocypris Karaman, 1972
 Leucalburnus Berg, 1916
 Leucaspius Heckel & Kner, 1857 (moderlieschen)
 Leuciscus Cuvier, 1816 (Eurasian dace)
 Leucos Heckel, 1843
 Mirogrex Goren, Fishelson & Trewavas, 1973
 Notemigonus Rafinesque, 1819 (golden shiner)
 Pachychilon Steindachner, 1882
 Parachondrostoma Robalo, Almada, Levy & Doadrio, 2007
 Pelasgus Kottelat & Freyhof, 2007
 Pelecus Agassiz, 1835 (sabre carp)
 Petroleuciscus Bogutskaya, 2002 (Ponto-Caspian chubs and daces)
 Phoxinellus Heckel, 1843
 Protochondrostoma Robalo, Almada, Levy & Doadrio, 2007
 Pseudochondrostoma Robalo, Almada, Levy & Doadrio, 2007
 Pseudophoxinus Bleeker, 1860
 Rutilus Rafinesque, 1820 (katum, perlfish and roach)
 Sarmarutilus Bianco & Ketmaier, 2014 (South European roach)
 Scardinius Bonaparte, 1837 (rudd)
 Squalius Bonaparte, 1837 (European chubs)
 Telestes Bonaparte, 1840
 Tropidophoxinellus Stephanidis 1974
 Vimba Fitzinger, 1873
 Creek chub -Palgopteran clade (cubfamily Plagopterinae sensu Schönhuth et al.):
 Couesius Jordan, 1878 (lake chub)
 Hemitremia Cope 1870 (flame chub)
 Lepidomeda Cope, 1874 (spinedaces)
 Margariscus Cockerell, 1909 (daces)
 Meda Girard, 1856 (pikedace)
 Plagopterus Cope, 1874 (woundfin)
 Semotilus Rafinesque, 1820 (creek chubs)
 Snyderichthys Miller, 1945 (leatherside chub)
 western clade (WC) (subfamily Laviniinae sensu Schönhuth et al.):
 Acrocheilus Agassiz, 1855 (chiselmouth)
 Chrosomus Rafinesque, 1820 (typical daces)
 Eremichthys Hubbs & Miller, 1948 (desert dace)
Evarra Woolman, 1894 (Mexican daces)
 Gila Baird & Girard, 1853 (western chubs)
 Hesperoleucus Snyder, 1913 (California roach)
 Lavinia Girard, 1854 (hitch)
 Moapa Baird & Girard, 1853 (moapa dace)
 Mylopharodon Ayres, 1855 (hardheads)
 Orthodon Girard, 1856 (Sacramento blackfish)
 Ptychocheilus Agassiz, 1855 (pikeminnows)
 Relictus Hubbs & Miller, 1972 (relict dace)
 Siphateles Cope, 1883
Far East Asian (FEA) Clade: (subfamily Pseudaspininae sensu Schönhuth et al.):
 Oreoleuciscus Warpachowski, 1889 (osmans)
 Pseudaspius Dybowski, 1869 (redfin)
 Rhynchocypris Günther, 1889 (Eurasian minnows)

Notes

References

 
Fish subfamilies
Taxa named by Charles Lucien Bonaparte